László Csoknyai (born 25 October 1987, in Dunaújváros) is a Hungarian judoka. He competed in the men's 81 kg event at the 2012 Summer Olympics; after defeating Putu Wiradamungga in the second round, he was eliminated by Kim Jae-Bum in the third round. He also competed at the 2016 Summer Olympics in the men's 81 kg event, in which he was eliminated by Takanori Nagase in the second round.

References

External links
 
 

1987 births
Living people
Hungarian male judoka
Olympic judoka of Hungary
Judoka at the 2012 Summer Olympics
Judoka at the 2016 Summer Olympics
People from Dunaújváros
Universiade medalists in judo
Universiade bronze medalists for Hungary
European Games competitors for Hungary
Judoka at the 2015 European Games
Medalists at the 2013 Summer Universiade
21st-century Hungarian people